Trine Eilertsen (born 1 May 1969) is a Norwegian journalist and newspaper editor. She is the current editor-in-chief of the Norwegian newspaper Aftenposten.

Early life and education
Eilertsen was born in Bærum and grew up at Sotra. She graduated from the Norwegian School of Economics and Business Administration in 1996 and from the University of Bergen in 1997.

Career
Eilertsen worked in Statoil as a trainee from 1998 to 1999 before being hired in Bergens Tidende as a journalist. She advanced to political subeditor in 2002 and editor-in-chief in 2008. She changed jobs to political commentator in the Norwegian Broadcasting Corporation in 2013, and political editor of Aftenposten in 2014.

Other activities
 Trilateral Commission, Member of the European Group

References

1969 births
Living people
People from Bærum
People from Hordaland
Norwegian newspaper editors
Norwegian women editors
Norwegian School of Economics alumni
University of Bergen alumni
Aftenposten editors
Bergens Tidende editors